Geamăna may refer to several places in Romania:

 Geamăna, a village in Bradu Commune, Argeș County
 Geamăna, a village in Lupșa Commune, Alba County
 Geamăna, a village in Drăgoești Commune, Vâlcea County
 Geamăna, a village in Stoilești Commune, Vâlcea County
 Geamăna, a right tributary of the Homorod near Dumbrăvița, Brașov County
 Geamăna, a left tributary of the Homorod near Satu Nou, Brașov County
 Geamăna, a tributary of the Tazlău in Neamț County
 Geamăna, a flooded village  near Roșia Poieni copper mine
 Geamăna (Olt), a tributary of the Olt in Vâlcea County

and a village in Moldova:
 Geamăna, Anenii Noi, a commune in Anenii Noi district